Kill the Sun is the German band Xandria's debut album, released on May 5, 2003 through Drakkar Entertainment label. The record includes one single, "Kill the Sun".

Background
This is the band's debut album. All songs which were to be found on the demo already plus another five which had been written in the meantime were recorded for it with producer Dirk Riegner, also known as the keyboard player of Secret Discovery and recently as the producer of Milú. After a short period of pre-production at Dirk Riegner's studio, which then was located right beside the grounds of the Zeche Bochum, the band entered Principal Studio in Münster in 2003. Within one week, the instrumental parts were recorded, and for the vocal recordings the band again went to Bochum to the small studio of the producer. Afterwards, the album was mixed on the grounds of the Horus Sound Studios (also Guano Apes etc.) in Hannover at a small studio of mixing engineer Modo Bierkamp. Three months later, the result—provided with an artwork by Kai Hoffmann (also Secret Discovery)— hit the stores on May 5, 2003, and at once met with as much approval as to enter the German charts: On number 98 it only just hit them, but this was quite remarkable for a German band whose sound mainly was and still is influenced by gothic metal.

Track listing

Personnel
All information from the album booklet.

Xandria
 Lisa Schaphaus – vocals
 Marco Heubaum – guitars, keyboards, programming
 Philip Restemeier – guitars
 Roland Krueger – bass
 Gerit Lamm – drums

Additional musicians
Deutung – cello on "She's Nirvana"
Marco Minnemann – percussion on "She's Nirvana"
Andreas Litschel – intro on "Isis/Osiris"

Production
Kai Hoffmann – artwork, intro on "So You Disappear"
Britta Kühlmann – engineering
Modo Bierkamp – mixing, mastering
Dirk Riegner – producer, keyboards, programming
Dirk Schelpmeier – photography

References

External links
Album review on metal-archives.com
Official discography on xandria.de

2003 debut albums
Xandria albums
Drakkar Entertainment albums